Sudoku Gridmaster (known as Puzzle Series Vol. 3: Sudoku in Japan and Sudoku Master in Europe) is a Touch Generations puzzle video game for the Nintendo DS, released on March 23, 2006 in Japan, June 26, 2006 in the United States and October 27, 2006 in Europe. It was developed and published by Hudson Soft in Japan, and published by Nintendo in the rest of the world.

Gameplay 
The game features four hundred sudoku puzzles, four different tutorials as well as four difficulty settings (practice, easy, normal, and hard). If the player manages to perform well in the puzzle, they receive stars which can be used to take a sudoku test to determine their skill level. The game uses the Nintendo DS touch screen, which makes writing down and choosing different numbers easier.

It is a common misconception that this game has over 400 puzzles. The 'Rank Test' mode randomly chooses from the other puzzles. It is not randomly generated and it does not have its own set of puzzles.

There exists a bug in the game; after Platinum rank is obtained, the total playing time is summed up. Puzzles not yet completed at that point (and there can be many) are assigned a time of 99 hours, 59 minutes, 59 seconds. This raises the total playing time to "999 hours, 59 minutes, 59 seconds" regardless of actual playing time.

Development 

Sudoku Gridmaster was the first full sudoku game for the Nintendo DS console.

Reception 

IGN Craig Harris described the game as "good", but felt that Brain Age sudoku minigame was better. He reported the graphics and music as decent and functional. Harris was confident that the game's 400 puzzles would last a long time.

References

External links
Official site

2006 video games
Hudson Soft games
Nintendo DS games
Nintendo DS-only games
Puzzle video games
Sudoku
Touch! Generations
Video games developed in Japan
Single-player video games